The Challenge Costa Brava was a golf tournament on the Challenge Tour held at Empordà Golf on the Costa Brava near Girona, Spain.

Together with the Empordà Challenge, also hosted at Empordà Golf, the tournament served as a replacement for the China Swing with Hainan Open and Foshan Open, which was cancelled.

Winners

References

External links
Coverage on the Challenge Tour's official site

Former Challenge Tour events
Golf tournaments in Spain
Golf tournaments in Catalonia